Kinloch Laggan  is a hamlet located at the head of  Loch Laggan in Newtonmore, Inverness-shire, Scottish Highlands and is in the Scottish council area of Highland.

References

Populated places in Badenoch and Strathspey